KSDT may refer to:

 KSDT Radio, an online radio station of the University of California San Diego
 KSDT (AM), a radio station (1320 AM) licensed to Hemet, California, United States